Pinus lumholtzii, the Lumholtz's pine or pino triste ('sad pine' in Spanish),  is a species of conifer in the family Pinaceae. It is endemic to northwestern Mexico. It is named after Norwegian explorer Carl Sofus Lumholtz.

This pine occurs only in the states of Chihuahua, Durango, Zacatecas, Nayarit, Jalisco, Aguascalientes (29° to 22° North latitude). It grows in warm temperate and cool climates, with summer rainfall.

It is on the IUCN Red List of endangered plant species in Mexico.

References

lumholtzii
Trees of Mexico
Endemic flora of Mexico
Trees of Chihuahua (state)
Trees of Zacatecas
Trees of Nayarit
Trees of Jalisco
Trees of Aguascalientes
Flora of Northeastern Mexico
Trees of temperate climates
Least concern plants
Taxonomy articles created by Polbot
Flora of the Sierra Madre Occidental